The Cistercian Monks of Stift Heiligenkreuz is the artistic name of the Choralschola of Cistercian monks from the Lower Austrian abbey Heiligenkreuz who have so far recorded six CDs of Gregorian chant that have attracted the attention of European and world music public. The names of individual singers have never been specifically published because monks see themselves primarily as people dedicated to God who sing for religious and non-professional reasons.

The Cistercians of the Heiligenkreuz abbey founded in 2011 their own record label Obsculta Music and have received prestigious awards and recognitions for their public musical achievements. Their first music album Chant: Music for Paradise was released by Universal Music in 2008 (under this name the album was released in Europe, while in the rest of the world it was released under the title Chant: Music for the Soul). Just this album achieved several gold and platinum music recording certifications soon after its release and also won the German music award ECHO Klassik in the category "Bestseller of the Year" in 2009.

Discography 

 2008 – Chant: Music for Paradise, UCJ Music / Universal Music, CD 4766774 / Chant: Music for the Soul, London – Decca, CD B0011489-02   
 2008 – Chant: Music for Paradise, Universal Music / UCJ Music, 2xCD 4766977
 2010 – Best of Gregorian Chant (compilation album): Zisterzienser Mönche vom Stift Heiligenkreuz, Choralschola des Klosters Santo Domingo de Silos u.a., Deutsche Grammophon, CD 480 3408   
 2011 – Chant: Amor et Passio, Obsculta Music / Preiser Records, CD 91200
 2011 – VESPERÆ. Baroque Vespers at Stift Heiligenkreuz – Ensemble dolce risonanza, Florian Wieninger & The Cistercian Monks of Stift Heiligenkreuz, Oehms Classics, CD 826
 2012 – Chant: Stabat Mater, Obsculta Music, CD OM 0003
 2012 – Chant: Missa Latina, Obsculta Music, CD OM 0002
 2014 – Chant: Into the Light, Obsculta Music, CD OSM 0004
 2015 – Chant for Peace, Deutsche Grammophon, CD 479 4709 GH

Awards and honors 
 2008 – Golden record for the album Chant: Music for Paradise in Belgium United Kingdom, Germany and Poland  
 2008 – Platinum record in Netherlands for the album Chant: Music for Paradise
 2008 – Media Award (in German: "Medienpreis") of the Lower Austrian Tourism Award 2008   
 2009 – Nomination for the Echo Music Prize in the category "Newcomer international"
 2009 – Double Platinum record in Poland for the album Chant: Music for Paradise
 2009 – ECHO Klassik in the category "Bestseller of the Year"  for the album Chant: Music for Paradise

References

External links 
 
 
 
 Spotify: Cistercian Monks of Stift Heiligenkreuz
 The official Heiligenkreuz Abbey website  

Austrian musical groups
Austrian choirs
Church choirs